Lynchville may refer to:
Lynchville, California, former name of San Ramon, California
Lynchville, New York, an early name for Rome, New York
Lynchville, Pennsylvania, a location near Pennsylvania State Game Lands Number 25
Lynchville, Texas, a former small town that is now part of Northeast El Paso, Texas

See also
Lynchburg (disambiguation)